Galarraga is a surname of Basque origin. Notable people with the surname include:

 Amalia Galárraga (c. 1884 – 1971), Spanish feminist
 Andrés Galarraga (born 1961), Venezuelan professional baseball first baseman
 Armando Galarraga (born 1982), Venezuelan professional baseball pitcher
 Belen Galarraga (born 1993), Ecuador-born beauty pageant titleholder for Portugal
 Manuel Eguiguren Galarraga (1930–2012), Spain-born Bolivian Roman Catholic bishop
 Margarita Salaverría Galárraga (1911–2000), Spain's first woman diplomat
 Isidro Lángara (full name Isidro Lángara Galarraga; 1912–1992), Spanish football striker
 Eduardo Maceira (full name Eduardo José Maceira Galarraga; born 1996), Venezuelan footballer

See also
 Armando Galarraga's near-perfect game, historic baseball game played on June 2, 2010